The Redding Rodeo is a major stop on the professional rodeo circuit that takes place in Redding, California, United States. It began in 1948 and was inducted to the ProRodeo Hall of Fame in 2016.

After being cancelled in 2020 due to the COVID-19 pandemic, the Redding Rodeo returned May 14, 2021, broadcast on The Cowboy Channel.

References

External links 
 Official website

Rodeo in the United States
ProRodeo Hall of Fame inductees
1948 establishments in California
Recurring sporting events established in 1948